The Royal Commission on Nuclear Power Generation in New Zealand was set up in 1976 and reported back to the Government in 1978. The report concluded that there was no immediate need to generate electric power by nuclear means but it may be economically possible in the 21st century.

See also
Anti-nuclear movement in New Zealand
Environment of New Zealand

References
https://archive.org/details/nuclear-power-nz-1978
Nuclear technology in New Zealand
Political history of New Zealand
1978 in the environment
1976 establishments in New Zealand
Royal commissions in New Zealand